Islamabad may refer to:
 Islamabad, the national capital of Pakistan
 Islamabad Capital Territory, a federal territory of Pakistan that includes the capital Islamabad and other areas

Islamabad may also refer to:

Places
 Islamabad Union, a union council in Cox's Bazar District, Bangladesh
 Anantnag, also known as Islamabad, a city in Jammu and Kashmir, India
 Chittagong, historically known as Islamabad, a city in Bangladesh
Eslamabad, name of various places in Iran
Islamabad, Saroke, a locality in Punjab, Pakistan

Sports
 Islamabad United, a professional cricket team based in Islamabad that competes in the Pakistan Super League

Other uses
 , a Pakistani steamship in service from 1951 to at least 1972
 Islamabad, Tilford, the international headquarters of the Ahmadiyya Muslim Community in England